Kyogoku may refer to:
 Kyōgoku, Hokkaidō, a town on the Japanese island of Hokkaidō
 Kyōgoku clan, a Japanese clan
 Aya Kyōgoku, a video game developer currently working at Nintendo